The pale-crowned cisticola (Cisticola cinnamomeus) is a species of bird in the family Cisticolidae.

Taxonomy
Cisticola cinnamomeus was split from Cisticola brunnescens (pectoral-patch cisticola); since 2000 it has been recognised as a separate species by most world bird-listing authorities.

Distribution
It is found in Africa from eastern South Africa to Gabon and Tanzania.

Habitat
Its natural habitats are damp or marshy areas in upland grassland.

References

External links
 Pectoral-patch cisticola - Species text in The Atlas of Southern African Birds.

pale-crowned cisticola
Birds of Sub-Saharan Africa
Birds of Southern Africa
pale-crowned cisticola

eo:Brustomakula cistikolo
pt:Cisticola brunnescens